Dastgerd-e Dargaz (also Romanized as Dastgerd-e Dargāz) is a village in Gowharan Rural District, Gowharan District, Bashagard County, Hormozgan Province, Iran. At the 2006 census, its population was 487, in 122 families.

References 

Populated places in Bashagard County